Wayne Executive Jetport  is a public use airport three miles north of Goldsboro, in Wayne County, North Carolina. The airport is owned by Wayne County. It was formerly Goldsboro-Wayne Municipal Airport, when it was owned by both City of Goldsboro and Wayne County.

 The GWW code is not currently used by the IATA, but it was previously assigned to the former RAF Gatow in Berlin, Germany.

Facilities
The airport covers 249 acres (101 ha) at an elevation of 133 feet (41 m). Its single runway, 5/23, is 5,500 by 100 feet (1,676 x 30 m) asphalt.

In the year ending May 26, 2011 the airport had 16,200 aircraft operations, average 44 per day: 82% general aviation, 12% air taxi, and 6% military. 48 aircraft were then based at this airport: 81% single-engine, 10% multi-engine, 4% jet, 2% helicopter, and 2% glider.

References

External links 
  at North Carolina DOT airport guide
 Aerial image as of March 1993 from USGS The National Map
 

Airports in North Carolina
Transportation in Wayne County, North Carolina
Buildings and structures in Wayne County, North Carolina